Viktória Čerňanská (born 29 March 2002) is a Slovak bobsledder who competed at the 2022 Winter Olympics.

Career
Čerňanská represented Slovakia at the 2020 Winter Youth Olympics in the monobob event and won a silver medal.

She competed at the 2022 IBSF Junior World Championships where she won a gold medal in the U23 monobob, and a silver medal in the two-woman.

She represented Slovakia at the 2022 Winter Olympics in the monobob event.

References

2002 births
Living people
Slovak female bobsledders
Olympic bobsledders of Slovakia
Bobsledders at the 2020 Winter Youth Olympics
Medalists at the 2020 Winter Youth Olympics
Bobsledders at the 2022 Winter Olympics
Sportspeople from Bratislava